Larga Valley is a valley  long, trending northeast–southwest in the western part of Seymour Island, Antarctica.

The feature was descriptively named "Quebrada Larga" (long valley) in Argentine geological reports and maps of 1978; the term valley has been substituted in place of "quebrada" in the approved name.

References

External links

Valleys of Graham Land
Landforms of the James Ross Island group